The 2011–12 Western Football League season (known as the 2011–12 Toolstation Western Football League for sponsorship reasons) was the 110th in the history of the Western Football League, a football competition in England. Teams were divided into two divisions; the Premier and the First.

The league champions for the first time in their history were Merthyr Town, who were promoted to the Southern League. The champions of Division One were Cadbury Heath.

Premier Division
The Premier Division featured two new clubs in a league of 18, reduced from 19 the previous season after the relegation of Wellington and Welton Rovers, and the late resignation of Dawlish Town:

Bridport, third in the First Division.
Merthyr Town, champions of the First Division.

Dawlish Town withdrew from the league on 22 July 2011, after the fixtures for the new season had been announced. A new fixture list was subsequently compiled.

League table

First Division
The First Division featured two new clubs in a league of 19, after Merthyr Town and Bridport were promoted to the Premier Division:

Wellington, relegated from the Premier Division.
Welton Rovers, relegated from the Premier Division.

League table

References
 League tables

External links
 Western League Official Site

2011-12
9